Mugalzhar is a district of Aktobe Region in Kazakhstan. The administrative center of the district is the town of Kandyagash. Two more towns, Embi and Zhem, belong to the district. Population:

References

Districts of Kazakhstan
Aktobe Region